Chermside may refer to:

People
Herbert Chermside (1850–1929), British general and governor of Queensland, Australia
Robert Alexander Chermside (1792–1860), British physician

Places
Chermside, Queensland, a major suburb of the City of Brisbane, Queensland, Australia
Chermside bus station, a bus station at Chermside, Queensland, Australia
Westfield Chermside, a large shopping centre in Queensland, Australia
Chermside West, Queensland,  a suburb in the City of Brisbane, Queensland, Australia
Electoral district of Chermside, an electoral district of the Legislative Assembly in Queensland, Australia
Electoral results for the district of Chermside